Borin Van Loon (born 1951 in East Anglia) is a British illustrator and comic book artist, best known for his illustrations for the   Introducing... series of graphic books on complex subjects. He is an author, collagist, and surrealist painter, and has worked for a wide variety of clients in editorial, publishing and promotion. He has created an eclectic collage/cartoon mural on the subject of DNA and genetics for the Health Matters Gallery in London's Science Museum.

Van Loon published The Bart Dickon Omnibus of his hero's derring-do in 2005 comprising a surrealist collage graphic novel. Roger Sabin, a writer about comics and lecturer at Central St. Martins in London, England, said of the Bart Dickon series:

Van Loon's collage comic strip approach to storytelling relies almost solely upon found images, serendipity in research, and the use of a narrative to bind the images, speech and thought bubbles, and text boxes together. The roots of collage comic-strip can be found in the sound-collage experiments of Ron Geesin, the animations of Monty Python (during the Terry Gilliam era), the surrealist novels of Max Ernst (Une Semaine de Bonté and 'La femme de 100 têtes), the agit-prop visuals of the Situationists, the psychedelic posters and graphics of Martin Sharp and the satires of Biff.

Originally appearing as separate strips under the title 'A Severed Head' (a nod to the Iris Murdoch novel), Bart Dickon appeared in Brain Damage, Talking Turkey, Sun Zoom Spark and The Chap magazines. The author gathered a number of these comics, reworked and added new material to create a graphic novella.

Van Loon illustrated Capitalism for Beginners, Darwin for Beginners, and  DNA for Beginners (in eclectic documentary comic book format) for Writers and Readers in the early 1980s. He has since has illustrated more than a dozen entries in the Introducing... series, published by Icon Books in the UK, including four titles written by Ziauddin Sardar.

Van Loon has written, designed and illustrated two model-making books: DNA: The Marvellous Molecule, which enables the reader to build a colour model of the double-helix structure discovered in 1953 by Francis Crick and James D. Watson with Maurice Wilkins and Rosalind Franklin; and Geodesic Domes, where the models celebrate the pioneering work of Buckminster Fuller. He also painted many oil studies and designed the diagrams for the Letts Pocket Guide To The Weather.

/blankpage was a collaborative project with sixteen other artists belonging to Freelance (which Borin chairs) created for Ip-Art 2004. It consisted of a book as an art object with pages in widely varying media, all put together by a bookbinder. /blankpage  now has a permanent home in the Suffolk Record Office, Ipswich.

Bibliography 
 DNA: The Marvellous Molecule (Parkwest Pubns), 1991, 
 Letts Pocket Guide to the Weather (written by Eleanor Lawrence, New Holland Publishers Ltd), 1993
 Geodesic Domes (Parkwest Pubns), 1994, 
 The Bart Dickon Omnibus (Severed Head Books), 2005,

...For Beginners series (Writers and Readers) 
 Capitalism for Beginners (written by Robert Lekachman), 1981
 Darwin for Beginners (written by Jonathan Miller), 1982
 DNA for Beginners (written by Israel Rosenfield and Ed Ziff), 1983

Introducing... series (Icon Books) 
 Introducing Darwin (written by Jonathan Miller), 1992 — re-issue of the 1982 Writers and Readers book, Darwin for Beginners
 Introducing Genetics (written by Steve Jones), 1993
 Introducing Buddha (written by Jane Hope), 1994
 Introducing Sociology (written by Richard Osborne), 1996
 Introducing Cultural Studies (written by Ziauddin Sardar), 1997
 Introducing Mathematics (written by Ziauddin Sardar), 1999
 Introducing Science Studies (written by Ziauddin Sardar), 1998
 Introducing Eastern Philosophy (written by Richard Osborne), 2000
 Introducing Media Studies (written by Ziauddin Sardar), 2000
 Introducing Critical Theory (written by Stuart Sim), 2001
 Introducing Hinduism (written by Vinay Lal), 2001
 Introducing Psychotherapy (written by Nigel C. Benson), 2003
 Introducing Statistics (written by Eileen Magnello), 2009

See also
Introducing Book Series

References

External links

British illustrators
British comic strip cartoonists
Living people
1951 births